Rice dumpling may refer to:

Zongzi
Tangyuan (food)
Lo mai chi
Lepet
Pundi
Ketupat